The 2020–21 North Carolina A&T Aggies men's basketball team represented North Carolina Agricultural and Technical State University in the 2020–21 NCAA Division I men's basketball season. The Aggies, led by first-year head coach Willie Jones, played their home games at the Corbett Sports Center in Greensboro, North Carolina as members of the Mid-Eastern Athletic Conference.

Roster

Schedule and results

|-
!colspan=12 style=| Regular season

|-
!colspan=12 style=|MEAC tournament

|-

Sources

Notes

References

North Carolina A&T Aggies men's basketball seasons
North Carolina AandT Aggies
North Carolina AandT Aggies men's basketball
North Carolina AandT Aggies men's basketball